Mongol invasion of Hungary may refer to:
First Mongol invasion of Hungary, 1241–1242
Battle of Mohi
Second Mongol invasion of Hungary, 1285–1286